Events from the year 1907 in the United States.

Incumbents

Federal Government 
 President: Theodore Roosevelt (R-New York)
 Vice President: Charles W. Fairbanks (R-Indiana)
 Chief Justice: Melville Fuller (Illinois)
 Speaker of the House of Representatives: Joseph Gurney Cannon (R-Illinois)
 Congress: 59th (until March 4), 60th (starting March 4)

Events

January–March
 January 1 – Daniel J. Tobin becomes president of the Teamsters, beginning a 45-year presidency.
 January 23 – Charles Curtis from Kansas becomes the first Native American U.S. Senator.
 February 6 – Nantahala National Forest is established.
 February 12 – The steamship Larchmont collides with the Harry Hamilton in Long Island Sound; 183 lives are lost.
 February 26 – President Theodore Roosevelt appoints Col. George Washington Goethals as chief engineer of the Panama Canal.
 March 1 – Colville National Forest is established.
 March 2 – Umpqua and Custer National Forest are established.
 March 9 – Reclamation Service within the Department of the Interior.

April–June
 April – This month's issue of Good Housekeeping magazine displays the cover price One Dollar a Year (under the title).
 April 7 – Hersheypark opens in Hershey, Pennsylvania.
 April 15 – Triangle Fraternity, for engineering and related majors, is founded at Pennsylvania State University.
 April 17 – Today is the all-time busiest day of immigration through Ellis Island; this will be the busiest year ever seen here, with 1.1 million immigrants arriving.
 May 25 – Inyo National Forest is established.

July–September
 July 1 – The United States Treasury stops collecting interest on the 1879 $10 Refunding Certificates, which have their value set at $21.30.
 July 21 – The  sinks after colliding with the lumber schooner San Pedro off Shelter Cove, California, resulting in 88 deaths.
 July 23 – Chugach National Forest is established.
 August 1 – Aeronautical Division established within the U.S. Army Signal Corps.
 August 15 – Ordination in Constantinople of Fr. Raphael Morgan, first African-American Eastern Orthodox priest, "Priest-Apostolic" to America and the West Indies.
 August 17 – Pike Place Market in Seattle, Washington officially opens for business.
 August 28 – UPS is founded by James E. (Jim) Casey in Seattle, Washington.
 September 7 – The new passenger liner  makes its maiden voyage from Liverpool, England to New York City.
 September 10 – The first Neiman Marcus luxury department store opens in Dallas, Texas.
 September 29 – A foundation stone is laid for the Washington National Cathedral; construction will not be fully completed until 1990.

October–December

 October 1 – Office of the Superintendent of Prisons and Prisoners established within Department of Justice.
 October 22 – Panic of 1907: A bank run forces New York's Knickerbocker Trust Company to suspend operations.
 October 24 – A major American financial crisis is averted when J. P. Morgan, E. H. Harriman, James Stillman, Henry Clay Frick, and other Wall Street financiers create a $25,000,000 pool to invest in the shares on the plunging New York Stock Exchange, ending the bank panic of 1907, a move which ultimately leads to establishment of the Federal Reserve System.
 November 3 – President Roosevelt approves the takeover of the Tennessee Coal, Iron and Railroad Company by J. P. Morgan's U.S. Steel company in the wake of the panic of 1907.
 November 7 – Delta Sigma Pi (a co-ed professional business fraternity) is founded at the School of Commerce, Accounts and Finance of New York University in New York City.
 November 16
 Indian Territory and Oklahoma Territory were combined to become Oklahoma, which is admitted into the Union as the 46th U.S. state (see History of Oklahoma).
 Passenger liner RMS Mauretania, the world's largest and fastest at this date, sets out on her maiden voyage from Liverpool (England) to New York.
 November 28 – Johnny Hayes wins the inaugural Yonkers Marathon.
 December 6 – Monongah Mining Disaster: A coal mine explosion kills 362 workers in Monongah, West Virginia.
 December 16 – The Great White Fleet departs Hampton Roads, Virginia on a 14-month circumnavigation of the globe.
 December 18 – Ouachita National Forest is established.
 December 19 – An explosion in a coal mine in Jacobs Creek, Pennsylvania kills 239.
 December 31 – The first electric ball drops in Times Square.

Undated
 Indiana becomes the world's first legislature to place laws permitting compulsory sterilization for eugenic purposes on the statute book.
 The Lockport Powerhouse is built in Illinois.
 The National Rural Education Association is founded in Indiana.
 The Osage Nation retains mineral rights in reservation lands.

Ongoing
 Progressive Era (1890s–1920s)
 Lochner era (c. 1897–c. 1937)
 Black Patch Tobacco Wars (1904–1909)
 Great White Fleet voyage (1907–1909)

Sport 
November 23 - Yale Bulldogs win their first IAAUS (later NCAA) College Football National Championship

Births
 January 2 – Gordon L. Allott, U.S. Senator from Colorado from 1955 to 1973 (died 1989)
 January 9
 Eldred G. Smith, patriarch (d. 2013)
 Earl W. Renfroe, African American orthodontist, educator, and activist (d. 2000)
 January 19 – Paul Fannin, U.S. Senator from Arizona from 1959 to 1965 (died 2002)
 February 3 – James A. Michener, novelist (died 1997)
 February 15 – Cesar Romero, actor (died 1994)
 February 22
 Sheldon Leonard, screen actor, writer, director and producer (died 1997)
 Robert Young, actor (died 1998)
 February 25 – Kathryn Wasserman Davis, philanthropist (died 2013)
 February 26 – Dub Taylor, screen character actor (died 1994)
 February 27 – Mildred Bailey, Native American jazz singer (died 1951)
 February 28 – Milton Caniff, cartoonist (died 1988)
 March 12 – Dorrit Hoffleit, astronomer (died 2007)
 April 21 – Wade Mainer, singer and banjoist (died 2011)
 May 4 – Lincoln Kirstein, cultural figure (died 1996)
 May 11 – Kent Taylor, screen actor (died 1987)
 May 12 – Katharine Hepburn, screen actress (died 2003)
 May 15 – Thomas J. Dodd, U.S. Senator from Connecticut from 1959 to 1971 (died 1971)
 May 26 – John Wayne, film actor and director (died 1979)
 May 27 – Rachel Carson, environmental writer (died 1964)
 June 6 – Nate Barragar, American football player and actor (died 1985)
 July 4
 John Anderson, discus thrower (died 1948)
 Gordon Griffith, actor, director and producer (died 1958)
 Howard Taubman, author and critic (died 1996)
 July 7 – Robert A. Heinlein, science fiction author (died 1988)
 August 19 – Thruston Ballard Morton, U.S. Senator from Kentucky from 1957 to 1968 (died 1982)
 August 21 – John G. Trump, electrical engineer, inventor and physicist (died 1985)
 August 29 – Lurene Tuttle, radio actress (died 1986)
 August 30 – John Mauchly, computer scientist (died 1980)
 August 31 – William Shawn, editor of The New Yorker (died 1992)
 September 1 – Walter Reuther, union leader, founded United Auto Workers (died 1970)
 September 17 – Warren E. Burger, 15th Chief Justice of the United States (died 1995)
 September 19 – Lewis F. Powell Jr., Associate Justice of the Supreme Court (died 1998)
 October 22 – Jimmie Foxx, baseball player, coach, and manager (died 1967)
 November 16 – Burgess Meredith, actor (died 1997)
 December 23 – James Roosevelt, businessman and politician (died 1991)
 December 25 
 Cab Calloway, African American jazz singer and bandleader (died 1994)
 Glenn McCarthy, oil tycoon (died 1988)
 Rufus P. Turner, African American electronic engineer (died 1982)
 December 26 – Albert Gore Sr., politician and father of Al Gore (died 1998)

Deaths
 January 2 – Henry R. Pease, U.S. Senator from Mississippi from 1874 to 1875 (born 1835)
 January 24 – Russell A. Alger, U.S. Senator from Michigan from 1902 to 1907 (born 1836)
 February 17 – Henry Steel Olcott, military officer and co-founder of the Theosophical Society (born 1832)
 March 9 – James L. Pugh, U.S. Senator from Alabama from 1880 to 1897 (born 1820)
 April 14 – Frank Manly Thorn, lawyer, politician, government official, essayist, journalist, humorist, inventor and 6th Superintendent of the United States Coast and Geodetic Survey (born 1836)
 April 23 – Alferd Packer, cannibal (born 1842)
 May 1 – Melissa Elizabeth Riddle Banta, poet (born 1834)
 May 4 – John Watts de Peyster, author, philanthropist and soldier (born 1821)
 May 8 – Edmund G. Ross, U.S. Senator from Kansas from 1866 to 1871 (born 1826)
 May 24 – John Patton, Jr., U.S. Senator from Michigan from 1894 to 1895 (born 1850)
 May 26 – Ida Saxton McKinley, First Lady of the United States (born 1847)
 June 11 – John Tyler Morgan, U.S. Senator from Alabama from 1877 to 1907 (born 1824)
 June 12 – Ellen Russell Emerson, ethnologist (born 1837)
 June 14 – William Le Baron Jenney, architect and civil engineer (born 1832)
 June 21 – Lucien Baker, U.S. Senator from Kansas from 1895 to 1901 (born 1846)
 July 11 – Robert Watt, miner (born 1832)
 July 25 – Peter Anderson, Union Army Medal of Honor recipient (born 1847)
 July 27 – Edmund Penus, U.S. Senator from Alabama from 1897 to 1907 (born 1821)
 August 1 – Lucy Mabel Hall-Brown, physician and writer (born 1843)
 August 3 – Augustus Saint-Gaudens, Beaux-Arts sculptor (born 1848 in Ireland)
 August 14 – William Birney, Union Army general, abolitionist, attorney and writer (born 1819)
 October 3 – Jacob Nash Victor, railroad builder (born 1835)
 October 8 – Mary Cyrene Burch Breckinridge, Second Lady of the United States (born 1826)
 October 30 – Caroline Dana Howe, author (born 1824)
 November 22 – Asaph Hall, astronomer (born 1829)
 December 7 – Carrie Clark, model, notably of Muriel's Babies cigar box fame
 December 23 – Stephen Mallory II, U.S. Senator from Florida from 1897 to 1907 (born 1848)
 Sarah Gibson Humphreys, author and suffragist (born 1830)

See also
 List of American films of 1907
 Timeline of United States history (1900–1929)

References

External links
 

 
1900s in the United States
United States
United States
Years of the 20th century in the United States